Pyramid Peak is a fourteen-thousand-foot mountain in the U.S. state of Colorado. It is the 47th highest mountain peak in Colorado, and 78th highest peak in the United States. The summit somewhat resembles a ragged square pyramid and is visible from the Roaring Fork River valley north of Aspen along the canyon of Maroon Creek.

Like many of the peaks in the Elks, Pyramid Peak is quite steep, especially compared to more gentle fourteeners such as Mount Elbert.

Climbing 

The standard climbing routes on Pyramid Peak are the northeast and northwest ridges (the latter is also known as the "Keyhole Route"). These routes involve difficult route finding (very difficult, in the case of the northwest ridge), high exposure, and a great deal of loose rock. Hence they are two of the most difficult and dangerous of all of the standard routes on the Colorado fourteeners.

See also

List of mountain peaks of Colorado
List of Colorado fourteeners

References

External links

 
 
 
 

Mountains of Colorado
Mountains of Pitkin County, Colorado
Fourteeners of Colorado